Dice is the debut comedy album by American comedian Andrew Dice Clay, released in 1989. It sold around 500,000 copies.

Track listing
 What If the Chick Gets Pregnant...
 Mother Goose
 A Day at the Beach
 Moby and the Japs
 Doctors and Nurses
 Smokin'
 The Attitude
 No Pity
 The Golden Age of Television
 Speedin'
 Couples in Love
 When I Was Young
 Shampoo
 Joey
 The Bait
 Masturbation
 Hoggin'
 No Guilt

Production
 Produced by Rick Rubin

Certifications

References

External links
Retro Junk

1989 debut albums
1989 live albums
Andrew Dice Clay albums
1980s comedy albums
Live comedy albums
Spoken word albums by American artists
Albums produced by Rick Rubin